Ludic may refer to:

Ludic language, a Finnic language in the Uralic language family
Ludic fallacy, is "the misuse of games to model real-life situations."
Ludic interface, are types of computer interface that are inherently "playful".
Ludology, Game studies (Not to be confused with Game theory.)